John McMillin may refer to:
 John S. McMillin, American lawyer, businessman and political figure
 John Ernest McMillin, member of the Canadian Parliament

See also
 John McMillan (disambiguation)